is a Shinto shrine located in Umi, Fukuoka prefecture, Japan. It is dedicated to Emperor Ōjin, Empress Jingū, Tamayori-bime, Sumiyoshi sanjin and Izanagi. In the former Modern system of ranked Shinto shrines, it was classified as a prefectural shrine (県社, kensha).

History
The shrine is venerated as the legendary place where Empress Jingū safely gave birth to the future Emperor Ōjin, and is still patronized by those praying for safe childbirth and smooth child rearing.
Beppyo shrines

Natural Treasures
The cluster of giant camphor trees called Kada’s Forest  (including the two old camphors that have been deemed Natural Treasures, "Yufuta’s Forest" and "Kinukake’s Forest").

Gallery

See also
List of Shinto shrines

References

External links
Official website 
Crossroad Fukuoka - Fukuoka Prefecture Tourist Information 

Shinto shrines in Fukuoka Prefecture
Hachiman shrines
Religious buildings and structures completed in 574